Clinical and Translational Gastroenterology is a monthly peer-reviewed open access medical journal covering gastroenterology. It was established in 2010 and is published by Springer Nature on behalf of the American College of Gastroenterology, of which it is the official online journal. It is also the sister journal of the American Journal of Gastroenterology. According to the Journal Citation Reports, the journal has a 2020 impact factor of 4.488. According to 2018, it ranked 20th out of 84th in the category of Gastroenterology & Hepatology. and making it the highest-impact open access journal in this category.

References

External links

Publications established in 2010
Gastroenterology and hepatology journals
Open access journals
English-language journals
Monthly journals
Academic journals associated with learned and professional societies of the United States
Nature Research academic journals